Günther Korten (26 July 1898 – 22 July 1944) was a German Colonel General and Chief of the General Staff of the Luftwaffe in World War II. He died from injuries suffered in the assassination attempt on Adolf Hitler on 20 July 1944.

Biography

Early life
Korten was born in Cologne as a son of the architect Hugo Korten (1855–1931) and his wife Marie Korten (1866–1942). At the beginning of World War I he was a cadet in the Prussian army. He served through the war in an engineering battalion. He continued his military career after the war in the Engineers, until he was selected in 1928 to participate in the secret pilot training programme in the Soviet Union. On returning to Weimar Germany he joined the "Bildstelle Berlin".

World War II
Korten, by then a captain, joined the Luftwaffe in 1934 as Nazi Germany started on its rearmament programme. He received training as a general staff officer and served for several years in the Air Ministry. He was a Colonel and Chief of the General Staff of Luftflotte 4 (4th Air Fleet) stationed in Austria.

At the beginning of 1940, Korten was transferred to the general staff of the Luftflotte 3 (3rd Air Fleet), in which he served during the Battle of France  and in the Battle of Britain. On 19 July he was promoted to Major-General. In January 1941 he transferred back to the 4th Air Fleet, in order to participate in the Balkans Campaign and in the assault on the Soviet Union (Operation Barbarossa). In August 1942 he was promoted to Lieutenant-General and took over the command over the I. Fliegerkorps, which fought at the southern sector of the Eastern Front and was temporarily transferred to the "Luftwaffenkommando Don" during the Battle of Stalingrad.

At the beginning of 1943 Korten was promoted to General and in the summer replaced Alfred Keller at Luftflotte 1 (1st Air Fleet). A few weeks later, on 25 August he accepted the position of Chief of the General Staff of the Luftwaffe, after the former Chief of the General Staff Hans Jeschonnek committed suicide.

Death

Korten was seriously wounded in the Wolfsschanze near Rastenburg during the 20 July Plot in 1944, in which Colonel Claus von Stauffenberg attempted to assassinate Hitler with a bomb. Two days after the assassination attempt he succumbed to his injuries in the military hospital attached to the Führer's headquarters. Like the other military victims Rudolf Schmundt and Heinz Brandt he was posthumously promoted, in his case to Colonel-General.

Originally, Korten was buried in the Tannenberg Memorial. He was reburied in the Friedhof Bergstraße cemetery in Steglitz, Berlin. The grave still exists.

Awards
 Iron Cross (1914), 2nd and 1st Class
 Clasp to the Iron Cross (1939), 2nd and 1st Class
Honour Cross of the World War 1914/1918
Pilot/Observer Badge In Gold with Diamonds
 German Cross in Gold (29 December 1942)
 Knight's Cross of the Iron Cross on 3 May 1941 as Generalmajor and Chief of the General Staff of Luftflotte 4
 Wound Badge of 20 July (posthumously)

References

Citations

Bibliography

 
 

1898 births
1944 deaths
German Army personnel of World War I
Luftwaffe World War II generals
Prussian Army personnel
Military personnel from Cologne
People from the Rhine Province
Recipients of the Gold German Cross
Recipients of the Knight's Cross of the Iron Cross
Recipients of the Order of the Cross of Liberty, 1st Class with a Star
Colonel generals of the Luftwaffe
Assassinated military personnel
Deaths by improvised explosive device